Leonardo de Figueroa (c. 1650, Utiel – 1730, Seville) was a Spanish architect active in Seville.

Works
In Seville.
Designed the Santa María Magdalena church (1691-1706).
Hospital de la Caridad ("Charity Hospital"). Façade.
Hospital de los Venerables (1675-1697).
Church of the Savior. Vaults and dome (From 1696 up to 1712).
Palace of San Telmo, Seville. Principal façade and baroque chapel (from 1722).
Church of St. Louis of the French (1699-1734).

Sources
 Rolf Toman, Barbara Borngässer. The Baroque: Architecture, Sculpture, Painting. Cologne: Köneman, 1998 

17th-century Spanish architects
18th-century Spanish architects
Spanish Baroque architects